Lloyd Butler is the name of:

 Lloyd Butler (footballer), English footballer
 Lloyd Butler (rower), American rower

See also
Butler (surname)